An imperial guard is a special group of troops of an empire.

Imperial Guard(s) may refer to:
 Guards Corps (German Empire) of the Prussian, and later of the Imperial German Army
 Imperial Guard (Iran)
 Imperial Guard (Japan)
 Imperial Guard (Napoleon I)
 Imperial Guard (Napoleon III)
 Imperial Guards (Tang dynasty)
 Imperial Guards (Qing China)
 Imperial Guard (Russia)

Fictional
 Imperial Guard (Marvel Comics)
 Imperial Guard (Warhammer 40,000)